Katherine Ayres is an American writer of children's literature.

Background
Born in 1947 in Columbus, Ohio, she was raised in Ohio, West Virginia, and New York. In 1965 she graduated from West Islip High School in West Islip, New York. She completed her BA at The College of Wooster in 1969 and her MA at Tufts University in 1974. Her first career was as a teacher and elementary school principal. In the 1990s she began writing for children.

Ayres coordinates the Chatham University Master of Fine Arts Program in Children’s and Adolescent Writing in Pittsburgh.

Books
 Family Tree, fiction (New York: Delacorte Press, 1996).
 North by Night: A Story of the Underground Railroad, fiction (New York: Delacorte Press, 1998).
 Voices at Whisper Bend, fiction (Middleton, Wisconsin: Pleasant Company, 1999).
 Silver Dollar Girl, fiction (New York: Delacorte Press, 2000).
 Under Copp's Hill, fiction (Middleton, Wisconsin: Pleasant Company, 2000).
 Stealing South: A Story of the Underground Railroad, fiction (New York: Delacorte Press, 2001).
 A Long Way, fiction (Cambridge: Candlewick Press, 2003).
 Macaroni Boy, fiction (New York: Delacorte Press, 2003).
 Matthew's Truck, fiction (Cambridge: Candlewick Press, 2005).
 Up, Down, and Around, fiction (Cambridge: Candlewick Press, 2007).

References

Sources
Contemporary Authors Online. The Gale Group, 2002.

External links
 Katherine Ayres website

1948 births
Living people
Writers from Pittsburgh
Chatham University faculty
People from West Islip, New York
American children's writers
American women children's writers
Writers from Columbus, Ohio
American women academics
21st-century American women